Nancy Asiko Onyango, commonly known as Nancy Onyango, is a Kenyan accountant, businesswoman and corporate executive, who is the Director of the Office of Internal Audit and Inspection at the International Monetary Fund. She was appointed on 4 December 2017, with the appointment to take effect on 1 February 2018. Before her appointment, she served as the CEO of Reliance Risk Advisory Solutions, a Nairobi-based consultancy firm.

Background and education
She was born in Kenya, attending local schools for her pre-university education. In 1984, she was admitted to the University of Nairobi (UoN), graduating in 1987, with a Bachelor of Commerce (BCom) degree in Accounting and Finance. She continued with her studies at UoN, graduating in 1989, with a Master of Business Administration (MBA) degree. Later in 2013, she enrolled into the United States International University Africa, graduating in 2016, with a Doctor of Business Administration (DrBA) degree. As part of her doctoral studies, she took courses at Columbia Business School, in New York City.

Career
For a period of nearly four years, from July 1995 until December 1998, she worked as a manager at PricewaterhouseCoopers, at their location in Uxbridge, London, United Kingdom. Following that, she was promoted to senior manager at the same firm, where she worked for another three and half years until August 2002. In July 2005, she was appointed Partner at PwC, leading the consulting unit at PwC East Africa, based in Nairobi, Kenya, specializing in technology, governance risk and compliance, serving in that capacity until June 2012. In July 2012, she was named the head of the then newly created Risk Assurance Services Unit at PwC East Africa, serving there until October 2014.

In January 2015, for a period of 20 months, she was appointed partner at Ernst & Young, serving as the head of governance, risk & compliance for the African continent, until August 2016. In December 2017, she was appointed to lead the Internal Audit unit at the IMF, effective February 2018.

Family
Nancy Onyango is a married mother of three sons.

Other considerations
She holds several board appointments, including as non-executive director of Kenya Commercial Bank Group, non-executive director of Cytonn Investments, and Fairtrade Africa, where she chairs the board's audit and finance committee.

See also
 Kellen Kariuki
 Stella Kilonzo
 Christine Lagarde
 Nokwanda Mngeni

References

External links

 Website of the International Monetary Fund
 Philanthropic Kenyan Auditor to keep IMF books

Living people
1964 births
Luo people
Kenyan accountants
University of Nairobi alumni
Women accountants
United States International University alumni
Columbia Business School alumni
21st-century Kenyan businesswomen
21st-century Kenyan businesspeople